In the mathematical field of graph theory, the Ellingham–Horton graphs are two 3-regular graphs on 54 and 78 vertices: the Ellingham–Horton 54-graph and the Ellingham–Horton 78-graph. They are named after Joseph D. Horton and Mark N. Ellingham, their discoverers. These two graphs provide counterexamples to the conjecture of W. T. Tutte that every cubic 3-connected bipartite graph is Hamiltonian. The book thickness of the Ellingham-Horton 54-graph and the Ellingham-Horton 78-graph is 3 and the queue numbers 2.

After the Horton graph, a number of smaller counterexamples to the Tutte conjecture were found.

At that time it was the smallest known counterexample to the Tutte conjecture. In 1989, Georges' graph, the smallest currently-known Non-Hamiltonian 3-connected cubic bipartite graph was discovered, containing 50 vertices.

Gallery

References

Individual graphs
Regular graphs